Dorota Trafankowska (born 28 July 1953) is a Polish retired gymnast. She was national champion in 1971.

Career 
Dorota was born in Poznan in the family of Miroslav Trabankovsky. She was a pupil of the Poznan rhythmic gymnastics school founded by Vanda Skrzydlevskaya in 1963. In the 70s–80s it was the best gymnastics school in the country, its representatives won the national championships almost continuously (until the victory of Travankovski won, then Grazyna Boyarskaya, and then Jadwig Hammering and Lucin Cervinskaya). At the 1969 World Championships in Varna, Travankovskaya took the 28th place in the individual All-Around, 11 places behind Boyarskaya and not much ahead of Alina Bosko. In 1971, representing the club "Energetic" from Poznań, Dorota won the Polish Championships. She also starred in the video "Her Portrait" (Polish: Jej portret) of Bogislaw Metz, one of the most popular performers of the country of those years. After Dorota's retirement she married and now lives in the United States.

References 

1953 births
Living people
Polish rhythmic gymnasts
People from Poznań